Non Stop Dancers were an Australian pop, funk band formed in 1984 by Kevin Jones on guitar and vocals, Karen Steains on bass guitar, Jane Stewart on keyboards, Brett Van Kriedt on drums, and his brother, Larry Van Kriedt on saxophone, guitar and vocals (ex-AC/DC, Eighty Eights). They released a full length album, Surprise Surprise, in December 1984. Their second single, "Shake this City", reached the Top 50 on the Kent Music Report Singles Chart. The group broke up in late 1986.

Discography

Studio albums

Singles

References

Australian musical groups
Living people
Musical groups established in 1983
Musical groups disestablished in 1986
Year of birth missing (living people)